Zainul Abdin Farroque is a Bangladesh Nationalist Party politician and a former member of parliament for Noakhali-2 and Noakhali-1.

Early life
Zainul Abdin Farroque was born on 10 December 1949.

Career
In 2009 Farroque was elected to Parliament as an opposition Member of Parliament and appointed the opposition whip. On 6 July 2011 he was injured by members of Bangladesh Police in an opposition demonstration near the Bangladesh Parliament. He sued the police officers involved and filled a 100 million taka lawsuit against the government. The case was dismissed after investigators submitted a Metropolitan Magistrate Mohammad Hasibul Haque blaming Farroque for the incident.

Farroque was arrested on 3 July 2017 by Bangladesh Police on cases that accused him of sabotage during protests against the government. He was granted bail on 6 September 2017 in two cases over protests against Bangladesh Awami League government. He is an adviser to former Prime Minister and Chairman of Bangladesh Nationalist Party, Khaleda Zia.

References

Bangladesh Nationalist Party politicians
Living people
5th Jatiya Sangsad members
6th Jatiya Sangsad members
7th Jatiya Sangsad members
8th Jatiya Sangsad members
9th Jatiya Sangsad members
1949 births
People from Senbagh Upazila